Schizophrenia Research is a peer-reviewed medical journal covering research on the cause, clinical diagnostics, and treatment of schizophrenia. It is an official journal of the Schizophrenia International Research Society and was established in 1988. The editor-in-chief is Matcheri Keshavan and the former editors are Henry Nasrallah (University of Cincinnati) and Lynn DeLisi (Harvard Medical School). According to Schizophrenia Research'''s original mission statement, the journal is aimed at 
 According to the Journal Citation Reports, the journal has a 2018 impact factor of 4.56 

 See also 
 List of psychiatry journals
 Schizophrenia Bulletin''

References

External links 
 

English-language journals
Psychiatry journals
Publications established in 1988
Elsevier academic journals